Amesdale is an unincorporated place and community in Unorganized Kenora District in northwestern Ontario, Canada. It is on the Canadian National Railway (CNR) transcontinental main line, between Niddrie to the west and Richan to the east, and is passed but not served by Via Rail transcontinental Canadian trains. It is also at the junction of a former CNR railway branch line through Ear Falls to Bruce Lake, Ontario that serviced the Griffith iron ore mine.

References

Communities in Kenora District